Nitrogenase (flavodoxin) is an enzyme with systematic name reduced flavodoxin:dinitrogen oxidoreductase (ATP-hydrolysing). This enzyme catalyses the following chemical reaction

 6 reduced flavodoxin + 6 H+ + N2 + n ATP  6 oxidized flavodoxin + 2 NH3 + n ADP + n phosphate

The enzyme is a complex of two proteins containing iron-sulfur centres and molybdenum.

See also 
 Nitrogenase

References

External links 
 

EC 1.19.6